Keep It Clean is a 1956 British black-and-white comedy film directed by David Paltenghi and starring Ronald Shiner as Bert Lane and Joan Sims as Violet Tarbottom.

Plot
Advertising agent Bert Lane (Ronald Shiner) plans to market his brother-in-law Peter's (Colin Gordon) new miracle cleaning machine. However, Bert's boss Mr. Bouncenboy (James Hayter) wants him to advertise Mrs Anstey's famous crumpets, but Bert's cheesecake advertising slogans incur the wrath of Mrs Anstey (Jean Cadell) and her Purity League, as well as that of his boss.

Cast

 Ronald Shiner as Bert Lane
 James Hayter as Mr. Bouncenboy
 Diane Hart as Kitty
 Ursula Howells as Pat Anstey
 Jean Cadell as Mrs. Anstey
 Colin Gordon as Peter
 Benny Lee as Tarbottom
 Joan Sims as Violet Tarbottom
 Denis Shaw as Slogger O'Reilly
 Tonia Bern as Colette Dare
 Gerald Campion as Rasher
Mark Daly as Stage Door Keeper	
Albert Whelan as Gregson	
Violet Gould as Lady Pecksniff	
Bert Brownbill as George Buxton	
Tony Sympson as Little Tailor	
Pauline Winter as Bridget	
Lillemor Knudsen as Audrey
Henry Longhurst as Magistrate	
Roger Maxwell as General Ponsenby-Goreham	
Arthur Goullet as Loan Service Official	
Norman Rossington as Arthur, the Bearded Ad Artist	
Humphrey Kent as Pat's Escort	
John Wadham as Loan Service Driver	
Harry Purvis as Charlie
Richard George as Police Constable
Frank Forsyth as Inspector at Court	
Howard Lang as Police Sergeant	
Robert Moore as Theatre Attendant	
The Kelroys as Acrobats	
Maya Koumani 
Yvonne Burke 
Lynn Shaw as Showgirls	
Christina Lubicz
Anne Lynn
Yvonne Olena
Pat Spencer
Thais Jobbling
Glynne Raymond
Eve Kenney
Diana Satow as Chorus Girls

Reception
The film was a commercial disappointment.

References

1956 comedy films
1950s British films
1950s English-language films
British black-and-white films
British comedy films
Eros Films films
Films directed by David Paltenghi
English-language comedy films